Man Alive is a 1945 romantic comedy film directed by Ray Enright and starring Pat O'Brien, Adolphe Menjou, Ellen Drew and Rudy Vallée.

Plot
Successful businessman Michael O'Flaherty "Speed" McBride (Pat O'Brien) is knocked out when a tramp he picked up drives his car into a river. Speed is rescued by a passing showboat. Meanwhile, the dead tramp is mistaken for Speed. Speed is eager to clear up the misidentification, but Kismet (Adolphe Menjou), a member of the crew, talks him into postponing that revelation. Speed has revealed that he is having marital problems with his wife Connie (Ellen Drew). Kismet convinces him to pretend to be a ghost to persuade Connie to get rid of a romantic rival, Gordon Tolliver (Rudy Vallée), Connie's old admirer. Comic hijinks ensue, but in the end, Connie realizes she still loves Speed.

Cast
 Pat O'Brien as Michael O'Flaherty "Speed" McBride
 Adolphe Menjou as Kismet
 Ellen Drew as Connie McBride
 Rudy Vallée as Gordon Tolliver
 Fortunio Bonanova as Prof. Zorado
 Joseph Crehan as Dr. James P. Whitney
 Jonathan Hale as Osborne
 Minna Gombell as Aunt Sophie
 Jason Robards, Sr. as Henry Fletcher (as Jason Robards)
 Jack Norton as Willie the Wino
 Carl 'Alfalfa' Switzer as Ignatius

References

External links
 
 
 
 
 Review of film at Variety

1945 films
1945 romantic comedy films
American romantic comedy films
American black-and-white films
Films scored by Leigh Harline
Films directed by Ray Enright
RKO Pictures films
1940s English-language films
1940s American films